Armijn Pane (18 August 1908 – 16 February 1970), also known as Adinata, A. Soul, Empe, A. Mada, A. Banner, and Kartono, was an Indonesian author.

Life
Armijn Pane was born in Moeara Sipongi, Tapanuli, Sumatra, the third of eight children. He began his education at the Hollandsch-Inlandsche Schools (HIS), in Padang Sidempuan, and Tanjung Balai and later joined the Europeesche Lagere School (ELS) in Sibolga and Bukit Tinggi. After graduating from ELS, he moved to Java where he began, but didn't finish, medical training at the School tot voor Indische Opleiding Artsen (STOVIA) in Jakarta and at the Nederlandsch-Indische Artsen School (NIAS) in Surabaya. He then transferred his efforts to writing and literature at the Algemene Middelbare School (AMS) in Surakarta, before graduating in 1931 with a degree in Western Classical Literature.

While still a student he was active for a short time in the nationalist youth organisation, but soon left this in favour of writing. He began his working life as a journalist in Jakarta and Surabaya, and also taught language and history at the national school in Kediri and Jakarta.
In 1933 he and Sutan Takdir Alisjahbana started the magazine, Poedjangga Baroe, where he served as the secretary and editor until 1938. In 1936 he joined the state publishing company, Balai Pustaka, where he worked throughout the Japanese occupation. It was also during this period that he wrote his first works, among them the play Lenggang Kencana (1937) and a collection of poems entitled Jiwa Berjiwa (Soul to Soul, 1941);

Following the Proclamation of Indonesian Independence, he became editor of Spektrum, and a few years later, editor of the Indonesian Cultural Magazine. He was also the editor of the magazine Indonesia from 1948 to 1955. During these years, he produced the play Jinak-jinak Merpati (Domestic Pigeons, 1953) and the collection of short stories Kisah antara Manusia (Stories about People, 1953). Other well-known works by Armijn Pane include: Iwa-inclined (1939), a collection of short stories, and the novel Belenggu (Shackles, 1940).

He was honoured for his work in literature by the Government of the Republic of Indonesia in 1969. He died in Jakarta only a few months later, in February 1970.

His brother, Sanusi Pane, was also a well known writer and journalist.

Works
Pane's novel Belenggu has been called his most important contribution to Indonesian literature. The novel met with mixed reviews after its publication in Poedjangga Baroe, and was widely criticised on two grounds: that the storyline was highly improbable since the characters acted differently from normal people; and that the story was immoral. The plot, a love triangle between a doctor, his wife and his mistress, was considered new and very shocking to many Indonesians, particularly so since the novel stops short of assigning blame. But the novel was also considered revolutionary in the way that Pane explored the feelings of his characters. Pane applied the technique of interior monologue and used elliptical dots and dashes following incomplete sentences to indicate the doubts and uncertainties assailing a modern educated Indonesian man. Due to both the style and content the novel is regarded as a milestone in Indonesian literature.

His early short stories had a similar focus. Barang Tidak Berharga (A Worthless Thing), published in 1935, was similar in subject matter and in tone, while Tudjuan Hidup (Life's Purpose), also written in 1935, is about a young woman's search for the courage to face a lonely future.

His later works, written after 1942, are considered by some to be quite different in character. A. Teeuw notes that many of the plays written during this period differ from Pane's earlier works in their idealism and the lack of the confusion and inner problems demonstrated by the characters. He also wrote a number of plays, and was one of the main authors who continued to do so during the Japanese occupation.

He has been credited with helping to lay the groundwork for the so-called "Generation of '45", but he was not part of that generation and in the post-revolutionary period made important contributions to Indonesian literature in other ways. During the 1950s he helped establish several cultural institutions and organisations, and also published a history of the Chinese since the nineteenth century, and a book on the development of the Indonesian language.

Selected list of works

Plays
Lukisan Masa, Jakarta: Poedjangga Baroe, 1937
Setahun di Bedahulu, Jakarta, 1938
Nyai Lenggang Kencana, Jakarta: Poedjangga Baroe, 1939
Kami, Perempuan, Jakarta, 1943
Antara Bumi dan Langit, Jakarta, 1944
Di Tepi Pancuran, Jakarta 1944
Melihat Bapak Mataku Buta, Jajarta 1944
Jembatan Garuda, Jakarta 1944
Kisah Antara Manusia, Jakarta: Balai Pustaka, 1953
Jinak-Jinak Merpati, Jakarta: Balai Pustaka, 1953

Novels
Belenggu (Shackles), Jakarta: Dian Rakyat, 1940

Poetry
Jiwa Berjiwa, Jakarta: Poedjangga Baroe, 1939
Gamelan Jiwa, Jakarta: Balai Pustaka, 1960

Anthologies
Kort overzich van de moderne Indonesische Literatuur, Balai Pustaka, 1949
Sanjak Muda Mr Muhammad Yamin, Jakarta: Firma Rada, 1953

References

Psychological fiction writers
Indonesian writers
1908 births
1970 deaths
People of Batak descent
People from Sumatra
STOVIA alumni